North San Pedro is a neighborhood of San Jose, California, located in northern Downtown San Jose, just north of San Pedro Square.

History
North San Pedro was a historically industrial part of Downtown San Jose, which was partially blighted during the age of urban renewal during the 1960s. Beginning in the 2000s, the San José Redevelopment Agency earmarked the area for redevelopment into an urban-transitional residential district for Downtown.

Since the onset of the California housing crisis, city leaders and non-profits have intensified housing developments in the area, particularly supporting affordable housing and transitional housing in the area.

Geography
North San Pedro is located in Downtown San Jose, just north of San Pedro Square. Its western border is formed by the Guadalupe Freeway (CA-87).

Parks and plazas
North San Pedro Park
Pellier Park

References

External links

Neighborhoods in San Jose, California
Downtown San Jose